Edward Farrell may refer to:

 Edward Farrell (athlete) (1885–1953), American track and field athlete
 Edward Farrell (Medal of Honor) (1833–?), American Civil War sailor and Medal of Honor recipient
 Edward Farrell (physician) (1842–1901), physician and political figure in Nova Scotia, Canada
 Edward Matthew Farrell (1854–1931), Canadian printer, publisher, and politician from the province of Nova Scotia
Doc Farrell (1901–1966), baseball player
Edward Shea Farrell (born 1957), American actor and producer
Ed Farrell, American football, see List of Pittsburgh Steelers players
Ted Farrell (Coronation Street), fictional character in Coronation Street
Ted Farrell (1889–1960), Australian footballer for Fitzroy and Richmond